Kostas Negrepontis (31 October 1897 – 19 February 1973) was a Greek footballer who played as a center forward in the 1920's and 1930's and a later manager. He was considered a great virtuoso of the ball, a football intelligence and a great shooter. He was a figure and was so dear to his fellows that never left their memory. Those who lived near him, those who worked with him, spoke with admiration about "Negro", as the fans called him. Calm, likeable and always optimistic, Negrepontis was the idol of fans and opponents. Negrepontis was one of the pillars of Greek football in his first steps and contributed to it both as a footballer, as a coach and as well as a football teacher for prospective coaches. He was distinguished for his passion, selflessness in terms of the progress of the Greek football, but especially for his beloved AEK, which he watched even when he got sick. Negrepontis was awarded for his great athletic activity in Greece by King Paul and by the Association of Sports Editors.

Club career

Negrepontis became an official member of the sports family for the first time in 1912. He started his football career as a young player in Turkey, playing for the Enosis Tataoulon, where he stayed for four years. In 1916 he moved to "The Greek football team", the football department of Pera Club, where in 1918 he became the team's captain. He also played for Fenerbahçe in the period 1917-18. Negrepontis was a pole of attraction and for the Greek youth of the region, as his influence was great. The kids were playing in the arenas with canvas balls full of shavings and trying to imitate "Negro's" shots, dribbles and moves. It was remarkable that whenever Pera Club played, the expression "Children, today Negrepontis is playing" prevailed, with the young people going to the stadium to admire him. With Pera Club he won a Turkish Championship in 1922. After the Greco-Turkish War in 1922, Negrepontis, as the team's captain, took the initiative to take Pera Club on a tour in Europe, with Greece being one of their stops and in a total of 47 games they achieved 43 wins, 2 draws and 2 defeats. Both the team and Negrepontis were admired by European fans for their achievements. In 1923 after Pera Club was dissolved, he moved to CASG Paris, where he became their captain in 1925. In 1925 he joined Sporting Douai, where he also became their captain. In 1926 Negrepontis returned to Greece and joined AEK Athens. In 1932 he led AEK to the conquest of the first Greek Cup, which was also the first trophy in their history, beating Aris by 5-3, with Negrepontis scoring the last goal for his team. In the same year, AEK won the Acropolis Cup, defeating the Austrian club, Wacker 4-2, from which both Olympiacos and Panathinaikos had been defeated. In 1933 Negrepontis ended up his career as a footballer, at the age of 36.

International career
In June 1929, Negrepontis became a member of Greece playing against Bulgaria in a friendly match that ended 1-1 coming in the game at the 46th minute. That was the second ever Greece's game and the first game that didn't lose. His second and last game was in March 1930 on a friendly match against Italy B in 3–0 defeat. He was only capped twice, because the HFF was established at the dawn of his career.

Managerial career

At the end of his football career Negrepontis also enacted with coaching. In fact, this happened for the first time in 1933 when AEK Athens were playing a qualifying match against Goudi. Their coach at the time was Emil Rauchmaul and Negrepontis was on holiday at Samos. The importance of the occasion brought him to prepare AEK for this crucial match and thus he was the first Greek coach of a big club, at a period when mostly foreign coaches were selected. AEK were the first club to work as a coach and the services he offered to the club lasted 16 years. During this period AEK won once the Greek Cup in 1939 and two Panhellenic championships, while Negrepontis gave to AEK and Greek football players such as Maropoulos, Tzanetis, Goulios, Delavinias, Kontoulis, Magiras, Manettas and Xenos.

After leaving AEK in 1948, he joined Fostiras, while in September 1949 he took over the technical leadership of Olympiacos. In September 1950 he became the coach of Panionios. Negrepontis also worked as the coach of Greece in four different periods between 1933 and 1953. He was the coach who achieved Greece's biggest victory of 8–0 against Syria in a match which took place on 25 November 1949 at Leoforos Alexandras Stadium. He won as the manager of the Greek military team the World Military Cup in 1952. In 1955 after a brief spell at Olympiacos, Negrepontis returned to AEK, where he won the Greek Cup in 1956. In February 1957 Negrepontis left AEK, but returned to their bench in 1958. In 1959 he took over the wheel of Atromitos. He also managed teams of the likes of Panelefsiniakos, Apollon Athens, Ethnikos Piraeus and Panegialios.

Death
In 1965 Negrepontis retired from football and died in 1973 after a 2 year strugle with illness. The former president of AEK Athens and author of the first history book about the club, Alexandros Makridis wrote in the Greek newspapaer, "Athlitiki Echo" about the loss of Negrepontis:

"As a former president, but also as one the founders of AEK, together with the whole world of the fans, I mourn the loss of Kostas Negrepontis. He was one of the creators of the glory of AEK, but also a brave and honest fighter in the stadiums, whether Greek or foreign. With the death of Kostas Negrepontis, perhaps the last of the old honest football fighters is lost, who fought only for the idea and the honor and the colors of Greece as an international football player, but also of the club he served. Kostas Negrepontis left an era as a moral footballer without wages and "bonuses". He was the creator of a football school, the coach of the National team and the Military team."

Honours

As a player

Pera Club
Turkish Championship: 1922

AEK Athens
Greek Cup: 1931–32

As a coach

AEK Athens
Panhellenic Championship: 1938–39, 1939–40
Greek Cup: 1938–39, 1955–56
Athens FCA Championship: 1940, 1946, 1947

Panionios
Athens FCA Championship: 1951

Greece military
World Military Cup: 1952

References

1897 births
1973 deaths
Greek footballers
Constantinopolitan Greeks
Emigrants from the Ottoman Empire to Greece
Greek football managers
Greece international footballers
Greece national football team managers
AEK Athens F.C. players
Fenerbahçe S.K. footballers
AEK Athens F.C. managers
Olympiacos F.C. managers
Panionios F.C. managers
Panachaiki F.C. managers
Turkish people of Greek descent
Footballers from Istanbul
Beyoğlu SK footballers
Association football forwards
SC Douai players
Turkish expatriate football managers